Vaclava Fleri  (1888–1983) was a Lithuanian painter.

See also
List of Lithuanian painters

References
Universal Lithuanian Encyclopedia

1888 births
1983 deaths
Artists from Vilnius
20th-century Lithuanian painters